Dhenuka (pronounced dhēnukā) is a rāgam (musical scale) in Carnatic music. It is the 9th Melakarta rāgam in the 72 melakarta rāgam system of Carnatic music.

It is called Dhunibinnashadjam in Muthuswami Dikshitar school of Carnatic music.

Structure and Lakshana

It is the 3rd rāgam in the 2nd chakra Netra. The mnemonic name is Netra-Go. The mnemonic phrase is sa ri ga ma pa dha ni. Its  structure (ascending and descending scale) is as follows (see swaras in Carnatic music for details on below notation and terms):
: 
: 
(Suddha Rishabham, Sadharana Gandharam, Suddha Madhyamam, Suddha Dhaivatham, Kakali Nishadham)

As it is a melakarta rāgam, by definition it is a sampoorna rāgam (has all seven notes in ascending and descending scale). It is the Suddha madhyamam equivalent of Shubhapantuvarali, which is the 45th melakarta.

Asampurna Melakarta 
Dhunibinnashadjam is the 9th Melakarta in the original list compiled by Venkatamakhin. The notes used in the scale are the same as Dhenuka.

Janya Rāgams
Dhenuka has a few janya rāgams (derived scales) associated with it. See List of Janya Rāgams for full list of rāgams associated with Dhenuka.

Compositions
TeliyalEru rAmA composed by Tyagaraja is one of the most often rendered in concerts.
Raavayya Rama composed by Dr. M. Balamuralikrishna

Film Songs

Language:Tamil

Related rāgams
This section covers the theoretical and scientific aspect of this rāgam.

Dhenuka's notes when shifted using Graha bhedam, yields 3 other Melakarta rāgams, namely, Shanmukhapriya, Chitrambari and Shoolini. Graha bhedam is the step taken in keeping the relative note frequencies same, while shifting the Shadjam to the next note in the rāgam.

Notes

References

Melakarta ragas